Georg Glockendon the Elder (fl. 1484; died 1514) was a Nuremberg-based woodblock cutter, printer and painter. Famed during his lifetime for his illuminations, he was also an industrious printer and published a number of the works of Erhard Etzlaub. The Erdapfel of Martin Behaim is the best known of his painted works, the majority of which remain unidentified. As a member of the Glockendon family of artists, he was the father of miniaturist and woodcutter Albrecht, who took over the family workshop, and master illuminator Nikolaus.

References
Smith, Jeffrey Chipps. "Glockendon." In Grove Art Online. Oxford Art Online,  (accessed February 3, 2012; subscription required).

External links
Entry for Georg Glockendon the Elder on the *Union List of Artist Names

15th-century German painters
German male painters
16th-century German painters
1514 deaths
Year of birth unknown